Bryce Bettancourt Florie (born May 21, 1970) is a former Major League Baseball pitcher.

Florie pitched for four teams, the San Diego Padres (–), the Milwaukee Brewers (1996–), the Detroit Tigers (–), and the Boston Red Sox (1999–), and finished his career with a 20–24 record, two saves, and an ERA of 4.47.

Florie's pitch selection included a sinking fastball from the 92-93 mph range, a slider, and a changeup.

Florie is remembered for suffering a facial injury that occurred on September 8, 2000 in Fenway Park. The Yankees' Ryan Thompson hit a line drive off Florie's face, causing multiple broken bones and eye damage. Florie made a comeback, pitching in seven games in 2001, but was released by the Red Sox in mid-season.

Florie played for the minor league Sacramento River Cats in 2002 and the Albuquerque Isotopes in 2004. After a two-year break, Florie returned to professional baseball in 2007 playing for the Macon Music of the independent South Coast League.  In addition to relief pitching, he also served as the team's pitching coach.

Florie joined the coaching staff of the River City Rascals as the pitching coach for the 2009 season.  The Rascals are members of the independent Frontier League. He is currently the pitching coach at his alma mater, Hanahan High School.

References

External links

Historic Baseball profile
MLB historical statistics
Dan Patrick article on comeback after injury

1970 births
Living people
San Diego Padres players
Milwaukee Brewers players
Detroit Tigers players
Boston Red Sox players
Baseball players from South Carolina
Major League Baseball pitchers
Arizona League Padres players
Spokane Indians players
Charleston Rainbows players
Waterloo Diamonds players
High Desert Mavericks players
Wichita Wranglers players
Las Vegas Stars (baseball) players
Lakeland Tigers players
Toledo Mud Hens players
Sarasota Red Sox players
Trenton Thunder players
Sacramento River Cats players
Albuquerque Isotopes players
Macon Music players